House of Derbent — was a younger branch of Shirvanshahs.

Name
Name derives from town of Derbent. Emirate of Derbent was ruled by local clan of Hashimids from 869 and was invaded numerous times by Shirvanshahs. Sometimes, sons or brothers of shahs were granted Derbent as a fief. Derbent was fully incorporated to Shirvan in 1065 by Shirvanshah Fariburz. Prince Sultan Muhammad of Shirvan was a wali of Derbent whose son Ibrahim I of Shirvan was a first shah of branch.

Dynasty
Family tree of Derbendis, including reigning shahs and pretenders (in bold) and princes and Tamerlane's dynasty.

Further reading
 Sara Ashurbeyli - "Shirvanshahs", Eurasia Press, Baku, 2006.

References